Whittlesea is a semi-rural town situated in the Hewu district, 37 km south of Queenstown (now called Komani), Eastern Cape Province, South Africa. The town is made up of the townships Ekuphumleni, Bhede, Extension 4, Extension 5 and Sada. The town falls under the Enoch Mgijima Local Municipality which is under the Chris Hani District Municipality. Surrounding Whittlesea are 36 villages which make up the Hewu (meaning "flat land' in Xhosa) district.

History

Founded in 1849, Whittlesea was as a military outpost created to protect white settlers during the Frontier War of 1850–1853. The town was named after Whittlesea in Cambridgeshire, birthplace of Sir Harry Smith (1787-1860), Governor of the Cape Colony from 1847 to 1852.  A British officer fortified five houses during the War of Mlanjeni (1850 to 1853), when the Xhosas besieged the settlement. One of these, which now forms part of the Post Office Complex,is still standing.  Between 1948- 1994, at the height of the apartheid regime in South Africa, Whittlesea belonged to the former Ciskei, a bantustan/ homeland established in 1961 under the Promotion of Self-Government Act of 1959. Until 1994, there was no formal political organisation in Whittlesea. The Department of Internal Affairs facilitated decisions around land use, services and rates in the townships through township managers. After South Africa's first democratic election, Whittlesea became governed by a council. Nowadays the town is under the Enoch Mgijima Local Municipality which covers areas such as Tarkastad & Queenstown

Landmarks

 Hewu Hospital (formerly operated by Lifecare, but provincialized since 2010) is to be found only 4 km on the road to Ekuphumleni Township.
 Whittlesea Library. Located at the municipality offices, the library caters for the town and the surrounding villages.
 Walter Sisulu University Whittlesea campus
 Whittlesea Police Station
 Department of Home Affairs
 Harrison Hope. Opened in 2009, the wine estate located on Harrison Farm outside of Whittlesea is the first wine estate in the Eastern Cape.
 Inkosi Wine is housed at the Shiloh Irrigation Scheme and was launched on 19 April 2017.

Economy

Whittlesea functions as a central town, providing services and shopping facilities to the surrounding villages. The inhabitants of the town rely on the neighbouring town of Queenstown for their economic needs. Due to the failure of the factories built by the Taiwanese in Sada in the 1990s, the underutilisation of small business complexes, a lack of funding and a lack of natural resources, Whittlesea has become a source of migrant labour. However, projects started by The South African National Roads Agency Ltd (SANRAL) and Expanded Public Works Programmes  have brought hope to the area.

Demographics

The following statistics describing Whittlesea are from the 2011 census.

 Area: 
 Population: 14756 : 
 Households: 9,473:

Villages
Some of the villages surrounding Whittlesea include;
Oxton village
Nyana
 Lower Didimana
 Upper Didimana
 Kamastone
 Bulhoek (Ntabelanga, Qhwabhi, Stratweni)
 Romanslaagte
 Tsitsikama
 KuzaNgqokwe
 Phelandaba
 McBright
 Mcewula
 KwaSemi
 Ensaam
 Thornhill
 EZola
 Lower Hukuwa
 Upper Hukuwa
 Ekuphumleni (Dongwe)
 Sada
 Tambo
 Cimezile
 Ngcamnga
 Mtha
 KuNdlambe
 Bede
Nkwankwankwa
Muswa
Mthwakazi
Hekeni (Hackney)
Zweledinga
Yonda
Dyamala
eMabheleni
Mbekweni
Gallawater
Long dry
Ngojini
Qawukeni
Upper Lahlangubo
eChibini
 Sihlabeni
Zangqokhwe
Lower Lahlangubo

External links

 Cape Socio-Economic Consultative Council
Fani ( Bradloof)

References

Populated places in the Enoch Mgijima Local Municipality